Jonathan Shapiro is a writer, producer, attorney and former Assistant U.S. Attorney as well as Of Counsel at Kirkland & Ellis. He is the co-creator and Executive Producer, with David E. Kelley, of Amazon Prime's TV show Goliath starring Billy Bob Thornton. Shapiro has written fiction, such as Deadly Force: A Lizzie Scott Novel (ABA Publishing 2014) as well as non-fiction, e.g. another book named Lawyers, Liars, and the Art of Storytelling (Ankerwycke 2015). Shapiro has also written episodes of TV shows such as The Blacklist, Boston Legal, The Practice, Mr. Mercedes and Life and is also a frequent collaborator of fellow attorney-writer-producer David E. Kelley.

Early life and background
Shapiro received an undergraduate degree and graduate degree at Harvard University in 1985, where he was a Rhodes Scholar at Oriel College at Oxford University, and his J.D. degree, at the University of California Berkeley School of Law in 1990. Shapiro is Jewish.

Legal career
While attending Berkeley Law's Boalt Hall, Shapiro worked as a staff writer for The Recorder from 1987-1990, then upon graduation, became a Trial Attorney with the U.S. Department of Justice (two years from 1990-1992) in Washington, D.C., and following that position, served as an Assistant U.S. Attorney for the United States Attorneys Office at the United States District Court for the Central District of California for six years from 1992-1998. He then entered private practice, working briefly at O'Melveny & Myers in 1998 before returning to the public sector as Chief of Staff for Lt. Governor Cruz Bustamante from 1999-2000. For the next 13 years from 2000-2013, Shapiro wrote and produced episodes for TV shows such as The Blacklist, Life, Boston Legal, The Practice, Justice, Just Legal and others. From 2013-2015, Shapiro was Of Counsel at Kirkland & Ellis LLP.

Shapiro was also the former chairman and member of the California Commission on Government Economy and Efficiency, and previously held the position of director and founder of the Public Counsel Victims of Torture Fund. In 2010, Shapiro was appointed to serve the State of California's Little Hoover Commission for a four-year term.

Shapiro also was an adjunct professor of law at the University of Southern California School of Law, where he taught federal criminal law.

TV/film career and writing
Starting from 2001, Shapiro wrote episodes and served as a story editor on The Practice, writing 16 episodes of the show. He wrote episodes of Just Legal, Justice, Boston Legal, Life,  The Paul Reiser Show, The Firm, The Blacklist and of Goliath, which he created with David E. Kelley.

Shapiro also served as a supervising producer and/or producer on The Practice and as a supervising producer on Boston Legal. He was executive producer on Just Legal, Justice, Life, The Paul Reiser Show and Goliath. He also was a consulting producer on The Firm.

In 2014 at the National Capital Chesapeake Bay Chapter's Emmy Awards held in Washington, D.C., Shapiro won an Emmy Award for the short film/PSA Fair and Free, which he conceived, wrote and produced and which also featured former U.S. Supreme Court Justice Sandra Day O'Connor. The short film was part of the National Association of Women Judges Informed Voters Project, which encourages women of all backgrounds to exercise their right to vote and make a difference in the electoral process. Shapiro also received a separate Emmy nomination for his script.

Shapiro has also received a Peabody Award for his writing work on Boston Legal and several Humanitas Awards for his writing and/or producing on Boston Legal (for the episode "Roe v. Wade: The Musical" (2008)) and The Practice (for the episodes "Honor Code" (2002) and "Final Judgment" (2006)), and was further nominated for an Edgar Allan Poe Award for his writing on The Practice episode "Killing Time" (1997).

In 2014, Shapiro published his non-fiction book Lawyers, Liars, and the Art of Storytelling (ABA Publishing). In 2015, Shapiro published his fiction book Deadly Force: A Lizzie Scott Novel (Ankerwycke), revolving Lizzie Scott, an Assistant U.S. Attorney at the US Attorney’s Office for the Central District of California.

References

External links 

Jonathan Shapiro's Official Website - "The Art of Telling Stories"
USC Gould School of Law Profile on Jonathan Shapiro - "Writing His Own Ticket"

Living people
American television producers
American television writers
American male television writers
UC Berkeley School of Law alumni
Primetime Emmy Award winners
California lawyers
Harvard University alumni
People associated with Kirkland & Ellis
Year of birth missing (living people)